Michael Tippett's Symphony No. 4 was written in 1977 as a commission for the Chicago Symphony Orchestra, who premiered it on 6 October of that year under the baton of Georg Solti. It was dedicated to Tippett's biographer and friend, Ian Kemp.

Form
It is written in one movement divided into seven sections:
Introduction and exposition
Development 1
Slow movement
Development 2
Scherzo and trios
Development 3
Recapitulation

In terms of form, it combines sonata and fantasia forms, as well as that of the symphonic poem.

Tippett's periods
Tippett called the work "a birth to death piece". This is emphasized by a "breathing effect", either from tape or sampler, particularly prominent at the beginning and the end of the symphony, with a single, unaccompanied intake of breath as its conclusion.

Stylistically, the Fourth Symphony unites all previous stylistic tendencies in Tippett's work: the counterpoint and gentle lyricism of his first creative period and the angular, spiky modernism of his second period, thus creating a third and final period. Tippett quotes the opening of this Symphony in his Piano Sonata No. 4.

Instrumentation 
Tippett's score calls for a large orchestra consisting of: 
 2 flutes (both doubling piccolos), 2 oboes, cor anglais, 2 clarinets, bass clarinet, 2 bassoons, contrabassoon 
 6 horns, 3 trumpets, 3 trombones, 2 tubas 
 timpani, Percussion (requires 4 players): snare drum, tenor drum, bass drum, tom-toms, cymbals, wood block, triangle, xylophone, marimba, vibraphone, glockenspiel, tubular bells, maracas, claves 
 harp, piano, tape or sampler (breathing effect)
 strings

References

Further reading
Lange, Art (December 1977). "Tippett's Fourth Symphony." Tempo, no. 123, pp. 53–54.

Tippett Symphony No. 4
Compositions by Michael Tippett
1977 compositions